Surya Bhojpuri is an Bhojpuri language entertainment channel that was owned by Surya Sagar Entertainment Pvt Ltd.

In March 2021, Dish TV announced that it would no longer carry Surya Bhojpuri. Tata Sky also dropped the channel.

Former shows
Koyla (TV series)
Imtihaan (2008 TV series)
Vishnupuran
Khandhan (TV series)
Jai Hanuman
Mircha Lagal
Gana Tanatan
Bhakti Ras
Jap La Prabhu Ke Naam
Bhakti Mein Shakti
Sajal Mai Ke Darbar
Hit Ba Fit Ba
Bhojpuriya Beat
Superhit Gaane Lagataar
Rang Barse

Sister channels

See also
List of Bhojpuri-language television channels

References

External links
 

Television stations in India
Television stations in New Delhi
Satellite television
Television channels and stations established in 2020